Deon Anthony Cole (born January 9, 1972) is an American comedian, actor, and screenwriter. He is best known for his role in the sitcom Black-ish (2014–2022), which earned him nominations for two NAACP Image Awards and two Screen Actors Guild Awards. On June 25, 2020, he became the second panelist to win the Dorris Award on the ABC version of To Tell the Truth.

Cole was nominated for two Primetime Emmy Awards for co-writing the late-night talk shows The Tonight Show with Conan O'Brien and Conan; for the latter, he was also nominated for three Writers Guild of America Awards.

Early life 
Cole was born in Chicago, Illinois on January 9, 1972. He was educated in Thornridge High School and received an acting degree from Philander Smith College.

Career 
Born in the Roseland neighborhood of Chicago, Cole started in comedy when a friend bet him $50 that he would not get up on stage one night in Chicago.

Cole was on the writing staff for The Tonight Show with Conan O'Brien from 2009 to 2010, and he worked as a writer for Conan from 2010 to 2012. He has appeared frequently in comedic bits for both broadcasts, and he has, along with the rest of the staff, received two Primetime Emmy nominations. Cole also performed on Conan O'Brien's "Legally Prohibited from Being Funny on Television Tour" in 2010.

In February 2010, Cole performed on "Comic Aid Haiti", a comedy performance that benefited victims of the 2010 Haiti earthquake.

Cole was on the cast of Angie Tribeca from 2016 to 2018.  Cole is part of a television ad campaign for Old Spice body wash, alongside actress/comedian Gabrielle Dennis.

Cole has a recurring role on the ABC sitcom Black-ish as Charlie Telphy. Cole was promoted to a main role beginning with season 4. He then made some appearances in the Black-ish's spin-off Grown-ish.

Cole has performed stand up on other programs such as John Oliver's New York Stand-Up Show, Mash Up and Lopez Tonight.  Cole created his own production company, Coled Blooded, to produce the sketch comedy show Deon Cole's Black Box. It premiered on June 10, 2013, on TBS, but it was canceled on October 25, 2013. Cole hosted the game show Face Value on BET in 2017.

In 2017, he performed in a half-hour set in the Netflix original series The Standups.

In October 2019, Netflix released a stand-up special called Deon Cole: Cole Hearted.

On June 25, 2020, Cole appeared on To Tell the Truth and won the Doris Award, becoming the second panelist to do so.

Personal life 

Cole has one son.

An only child, Deon was raised by his mother Charleen, who died in 2021. He dedicated his 2022 Netflix comedy special to her, Deon Cole: Charleen’s Boy, which was filmed on the first anniversary of her death.

Filmography

Film

Television

References

External links 

 
 
 Performance on Youtube

Living people
American male film actors
American male television actors
American male voice actors
African-American male comedians
American male comedians
1972 births
Writers from Chicago
20th-century American male actors
21st-century American male actors
21st-century American comedians
Comedians from Illinois
20th-century African-American people
21st-century African-American people